The 2013 WNBA season is the 14th season for the Indiana Fever of the Women's National Basketball Association.

Transactions

WNBA Draft
The following are the Fever's selections in the 2013 WNBA Draft. Layshia Clarendon 9th overall

Trades

Personnel changes

Additions

Subtractions

Roster

Depth

Season standings

Schedule

Preseason

|- style="background:#cfc;"
		 | 1 
		 | May 11
		 | @ San Antonio
		 | 
		 | Tamika Catchings (17)
		 | Tamika Catchings (6)
		 | Briann January (6)
		 | AT&T Center4325
		 | 1–0
|- style="background:#fcc;"
		 | 2 
		 | May 15
		 |  San Antonio
		 | 
		 | Sasha Goodlett (9)
		 | Jessica Breland (8)
		 | Briann January (3)
		 | Bankers Life Fieldhouse5339
		 | 1–1

Regular season

|- style="background:#cfc;"
		 | 1 
		 | May 24
		 | @ San Antonio
		 | 
		 | Catchings & Zellous (19)
		 | Erlana Larkins (12)
		 | Briann January (5)
		 | AT&T Center8054
		 | 1–0
|- style="background:#fcc;"
		 | 2 
		 | May 31
		 |  Atlanta
		 | 
		 | Tamika Catchings (20)
		 | Erlana Larkins (10)
		 | Briann January (7)
		 | Bankers Life Fieldhouse10756
		 | 1–1

|- style="background:#fcc;"
		 | 3 
		 | June 5
		 | @ NY Liberty
		 | 
		 | Tamika Catchings (21)
		 | Tamika Catchings (8)
		 | Briann January (5)
		 | Prudential Center7617
		 | 1–2
|- style="background:#fcc;"
		 | 4 
		 | June 8
		 |  Phoenix
		 | 
		 | Shavonte Zellous (29)
		 | Tamika Catchings (10)
		 | Briann January (5)
		 | Bankers Life Fieldhouse8672
		 | 1–3
|- style="background:#fcc;"
		 | 5 
		 | June 12
		 |  Connecticut
		 | 
		 | Shavonte Zellous (14)
		 | Karima Christmas (8)
		 | Layshia Clarendon (4)
		 | Bankers Life Fieldhouse6283
		 | 1–4
|- style="background:#fcc;"
		 | 6 
		 | June 16
		 | @ Washington
		 | 
		 | Shavonte Zellous (17)
		 | Larkins & Breland (7)
		 | Catchings & January (4)
		 | Verizon Center6649
		 | 1–5
|- style="background:#fcc;"
		 | 7 
		 | June 22
		 |  Chicago
		 | 
		 | Shavonte Zellous (17)
		 | Jessica Breland (7)
		 | Larkins & January (3)
		 | Bankers Life Fieldhouse7934
		 | 1–6
|- style="background:#fcc;"
		 | 8 
		 | June 25
		 | @ Atlanta
		 | 
		 | Shavonte Zellous (18)
		 | Karima Christmas (10)
		 | Briann January (5)
		 | Philips Arena10155
		 | 1–7
|- style="background:#cfc;"
		 | 9 
		 | June 28
		 |  Tulsa
		 | 
		 | Tamika Catchings (28)
		 | Karima Christmas (7)
		 | Briann January (4)
		 | Bankers Life Fieldhouse6957
		 | 2–7
|- style="background:#cfc;"
		 | 10 
		 | June 30
		 |  Seattle
		 | 
		 | Tamika Catchings (18)
		 | Jessica Breland (10)
		 | Tamika Catchings (5)
		 | Bankers Life Fieldhouse6355
		 | 3–7

|- style="background:#cfc;"
		 | 11 
		 | July 6
		 |  Connecticut
		 | 
		 | Tamika Catchings (22)
		 | Briann January (7)
		 | Christmas, January, & Clarendon (3)
		 | Bankers Life Fieldhouse6383
		 | 4–7
|- style="background:#fcc;"
		 | 12 
		 | July 11
		 |  Minnesota
		 | 
		 | Shavonte Zellous (14)
		 | Tamika Catchings (10)
		 | Briann January (4)
		 | Bankers Life Fieldhouse10230
		 | 4–8
|- style="background:#cfc;"
		 | 13 
		 | July 13
		 | @ NY Liberty
		 | 
		 | Erlana Larkins (15)
		 | Christmas & Catchings (7)
		 | Tamika Catchings (4)
		 | Prudential Center6772
		 | 5–8
|- style="background:#cfc;"
		 | 14 
		 | July 19
		 |  Washington
		 | 
		 | Shavonte Zellous (16)
		 | Erlana Larkins (9)
		 | Briann January (4)
		 | Bankers Life Fieldhouse6434
		 | 6–8
|- style="background:#cfc;"
		 | 15 
		 | July 21
		 | @ Washington
		 | 
		 | Tamika Catchings (23)
		 | Catchings & Larkins (10)
		 | Tamika Catchings (6)
		 | Verizon Center6516
		 | 7–8
|- style="background:#fcc;"
		 | 16 
		 | July 23
		 |  NY Liberty
		 | 
		 | Briann January (21)
		 | Erlana Larkins (16)
		 | Briann January (4)
		 | Bankers Life Fieldhouse7577
		 | 7–9
|- style="background:#cfc;"
		 | 17 
		 | July 25
		 | @ Tulsa
		 | 
		 | Tamika Catchings (23)
		 | Tamika Catchings (9)
		 | Shavonte Zellous (5)
		 | BOK Center5018
		 | 8–9

|- align="center"
|colspan="9" bgcolor="#bbcaff"|All-Star Break
|- style="background:#fcc;"
		 | 18 
		 | August 1
		 | @ Connecticut
		 | 
		 | Shavonte Zellous (20)
		 | Karima Christmas (9)
		 | Briann January (5)
		 | Mohegan Sun Arena4971
		 | 8–10
|- style="background:#cfc;"
		 | 19 
		 | August 3
		 |  Chicago
		 | 
		 | Tamika Catchings (17)
		 | Catchings & Larkins (10)
		 | Erin Phillips (3)
		 | Bankers Life Fieldhouse8610
		 | 9–10
|- style="background:#cfc;"
		 | 20 
		 | August 6
		 | @ Chicago
		 | 
		 | Tamika Catchings (18)
		 | Tamika Catchings (8)
		 | Briann January (3)
		 | Allstate Arena4135
		 | 10–10
|- style="background:#fcc;"
		 | 21 
		 | August 8
		 |  Los Angeles
		 | 
		 | Tamika Catchings (17)
		 | Erlana Larkins (13)
		 | Shavonte Zellous (4)
		 | Bankers Life Fieldhouse7076
		 | 10–11
|- style="background:#cfc;"
		 | 22 
		 | August 10
		 |  Atlanta
		 | 
		 | Tamika Catchings (21)
		 | Erlana Larkins (11)
		 | Briann January (5)
		 | Bankers Life Fieldhouse9271
		 | 11–11
|- style="background:#fcc;"
		 | 23 
		 | August 14
		 | @ Phoenix
		 | 
		 | Tamika Catchings (16)
		 | Tamika Catchings (8)
		 | Briann January (3)
		 | US Airways Center6135
		 | 11–12
|- style="background:#fcc;"
		 | 24 
		 | August 16
		 | @ Los Angeles
		 | 
		 | Catchings & Phillips (16)
		 | Tamika Catchings (6)
		 | Briann January (5)
		 | Staples Center11801
		 | 11–13
|- style="background:#fcc;"
		 | 25 
		 | August 17
		 | @ Seattle
		 | 
		 | Tamika Catchings (21)
		 | Erlana Larkins (9)
		 | Layshia Clarendon (4)
		 | Key Arena6889
		 | 11–14
|- style="background:#cfc;"
		 | 26 
		 | August 21
		 |  San Antonio
		 | 
		 | Shavonte Zellous (20)
		 | Catchings & Larkins (7)
		 | Larkins, January, & Clarendon (4)
		 | Bankers Life Fieldhouse7416
		 | 12–14
|- style="background:#fcc;"
		 | 27 
		 | August 24
		 | @ Minnesota
		 | 
		 | Tamika Catchings (22)
		 | Tamika Catchings (10)
		 | Briann January (7)
		 | Target Center9504
		 | 12–15
|- style="background:#cfc;"
		 | 28 
		 | August 30
		 | @ NY Liberty
		 | 
		 | Tamika Catchings (22)
		 | Tamika Catchings (10)
		 | Erlana Larkins (4)
		 | Prudential Center6621
		 | 13–15

|- style="background:#fcc;"
		 | 29 
		 | September 4
		 | @ Atlanta
		 | 
		 | Tamika Catchings (22)
		 | Erlana Larkins (17)
		 | Layshia Clarendon (5)
		 | Philips Arena4019
		 | 13–16
|- style="background:#cfc;"
		 | 30 
		 | September 6
		 | @ Chicago
		 | 
		 | Briann January (23)
		 | Erlana Larkins (12)
		 | Erlana Larkins (6)
		 | Allstate Arena5996
		 | 14–16
|- style="background:#cfc;"
		 | 31 
		 | September 7
		 |  Connecticut
		 | 
		 | Tamika Catchings (15)
		 | Jessica Breland (9)
		 | Layshia Clarendon (6)
		 | Bankers Life Fieldhouse9826
		 | 15–16
|- style="background:#fcc;"
		 | 32 
		 | September 10
		 |  Washington
		 | 
		 | Briann January (16)
		 | Erlana Larkins (9)
		 | January & Phillips (4)
		 | Bankers Life Fieldhouse8444
		 | 15–17
|- style="background:#cfc;"
		 | 33 
		 | September 13
		 |  NY Liberty
		 | 
		 | Tamika Catchings (23)
		 | Tamika Catchings (10)
		 | Briann January (4)
		 | Bankers Life Fieldhouse10571
		 | 16–17
|- style="background:#fcc;"
		 | 34 
		 | September 15
		 | @ Connecticut
		 | 
		 | Karima Christmas (21)
		 | Larkins & Pohlen (9)
		 | Larkins & Clarendon (4)
		 | Mohegan Sun Arena8478
		 | 16–18

Playoffs

|- style="background:#cfc;"
		 | 1 
		 | September 20
		 | @ Chicago
		 | 
		 | Shavonte Zellous (20)
		 | Erlana Larkins (11)
		 | Briann January (6)
		 | Allstate Arena5895
		 | 1–0
|- style="background:#cfc;"
		 | 2 
		 | September 22
		 |  Chicago
		 | 
		 | Tamika Catchings (18)
		 | Tamika Catchings (12)
		 | Briann January (4)
		 | Bankers Life Fieldhouse7144
		 | 2–0

|- style="background:#fcc;"
		 | 1 
		 | September 26
		 | @ Atlanta
		 | 
		 | Tamika Catchings (21)
		 | Erlana Larkins (12)
		 | Christmas & Clarendon (4)
		 | Philips Arena4238
		 | 0–1
|- style="background:#fcc;"
		 | 2 
		 | September 29
		 |  Atlanta
		 | 
		 | Tamika Catchings (24)
		 | Erlana Larkins (7)
		 | Shavonte Zellous (3)
		 | Bankers Life Fieldhouse7051
		 | 0–2

Statistics

Regular season

Awards and honors

References

External links

Indiana Fever seasons
Indiana
Indiana Fever